Sayyed Muhammad Tabatabei Fesharaki (Persian:سید محمد طباطبایی فشارکی) was an eminent shia jurist in 13th Lunar Hijrah. He was considered as Master of eminent religious scholars such as Muhammad Hosein Na'ini and Abdul-Karim Ha'eri Yazdi, the founder of Qom Seminary.

Life 

He was born in known family of Tabatabaei Sadat. His Father Abulqasem possessed an infant by the Name of Sayyed Muhammad in Fesharak Isfahan. Sayyed Muhammad lost his Father during early years but His Mother help him to complete the stage of education. Travelling in karbala, Muhammad participated in the courses of Hasan ibn Sayyed Muhammad Mujahid.
He Also learned knowledges of fiqh and principles from Fazil Ardekani as an eminent master. He also travelled to Najaf and took part in the courses od Mirazye Shirazi.He had a special relation with his master Mirza Shirazi such a way that Mirza consulted with him in solving the problems and different subjects.

Pupils 

He could introduced eminent pupils in shia religious sciences. some of them are as follow:
 Abdul-Karim Ha'eri Yazdi the founder of Qom Seminary
 Agha Zia Addin Araghi
 Allameh Shaykh Muhammad javad balaghi
 Hoseini Tehrani
 Mirza Muhammad Hosein Na'ini
 Sayyed ali Modarres Kochak
 Sayyed Hasan Modarres
 Shaykh Muhammad Reza Masjed Shahi

Works 

 Al Eqsal
 Al furu Al Muhammadyyah
 Al Khiarat
 Dima Al Salasah
 Essay on Al Kholal
 Essay On Primary of Bara'ah

Ethical characters 

He avoided to being familiar as Mujtahid and try to live in unfamiliarity.

See also 

 Intellectual movements in Iran
 Iranian Constitutional Revolution
 Mirza Hussein Naini
 Mohammad-Kazem Khorasani

References

External links
 Article features
 Author's biography
 Author's Journals

Iranian grand ayatollahs
Iranian writers
People of the Persian Constitutional Revolution